Trondsen is a surname. Notable people with the name include:

Anders Trondsen (born 1995), Norwegian footballer
Erling Trondsen (born 1959), Norwegian swimmer
Johan Trondsen (born 1922), Norwegian politician
Christoffer Trondsen Rustung (c. 1500–1565), Norwegian admiral
Nils Trondsen Thune (1835–??), Norwegian politician
Trond Trondsen (born 1994), Norwegian cyclist 

Norwegian-language surnames